Notomulciber flavolineatus is a species of beetle in the family Cerambycidae. It was described by Stephan von Breuning in 1947. It is known from Borneo.

References

Homonoeini
Beetles described in 1947